Bryceella is a genus of rotifers belonging to the family Proalidae.

The species of this genus are found in Europe.

Species:
 Bryceella perpusilla Wilts, Martinez Arbizu & Ahlrichs, 2010 
 Bryceella stylata (Milne, 1886)

References

Rotifer genera
Ploima